is the former mayor of Yokohama, Kanagawa in Japan. A graduate of Aoyama Gakuin University, he served at the Matsushita Institute of Government and Management before working in the House of Councillors in the Diet.

He was first elected mayor of Yokohama in April 2002 after serving in the House of Representatives in the Diet (national legislature) for three terms since July 1993.  He was re-elected in 2006.

He is longlisted for the 2008 World Mayor award.

Political career
1993-1996: first term in House of Representatives
1996-2000: second term in House of Representatives
2000-2002: third term in House of Representatives
2002-2006: first term as Mayor of Yokohama
2006-2010: second term as Mayor of Yokohama

See also 
 Tokyo International Conference on African Development (TICAD-IV), 2008.

References

External links 
 Profile on Yokohama city homepage
 CityMayors profile
  

Aoyama Gakuin University alumni
Members of the House of Representatives (Japan)
Mayors of Yokohama
Mayors of places in Kanagawa Prefecture
1964 births
Living people